Valentin Gennadyevich Kiselyov (born 21 January 1970) is a former Russian football player.

External links
 

1970 births
Sportspeople from Tula, Russia
Living people
FC Arsenal Tula players
Soviet footballers
Russian footballers
FC Lokomotiv Moscow players
Russian Premier League players
Association football forwards
FC Khimik-Arsenal players
FC Spartak Ryazan players